Mary Ann Sweeney (born 1945) is an American physicist at Sandia National Laboratories. Although her doctoral research concerned astronomy, her work at Sandia has largely concerned inertial confinement fusion and pulsed power.

Education and career
Sweeney is originally from Mercersburg, Pennsylvania; her parents moved to Baltimore when she was a teenager to improve their children's educational prospects. She majored in physics at Mount Holyoke College, graduating in 1967 with a bachelor's thesis concerning white dwarf stars. She went to Columbia University for doctoral study but, unable to find a faculty member at Columbia who would take a female student for the topics that interested her, finished her doctorate at Columbia with an outside advisor from Princeton University.

She married a fellow Columbia astronomy student and followed him to Albuquerque, where he had been assigned for his service in the United States Air Force. Seeking a science job nearby, Sweeney applied to work at Sandia National Laboratories, in "anything but secretarial work", and started her career in pulsed power physics there in 1974.

Sweeney chaired the IEEE Plasma Science and Applications Committee from 1989 to 1990, as its first female chair. She also chaired the Committee on Women in Plasma Physics of the American Physical Society from 2010 to 2012.

Contributions and recognition
In 1992, Sweeney was named a Fellow of the IEEE "for contributions to the understanding of plasma opening switches and beam interactions with matter in particle beam accelerators". In 2007, Mount Holyoke College gave her their Alumnae Achievement Award.

Sweeney won the 2013 National Nuclear Security Administration (NNSA)  Defense Programs Award of Excellence for her work as editor-in-chief of the NNSA Stockpile Stewardship and Management Plan. She is one of four coauthors of the book Impactful Times: Memories of 60 Years of Shock Wave Research at Sandia National Laboratories (2017).

Selected publications

References

1945 births
Living people
American astronomers
American women astronomers
American physicists
American women physicists
Plasma physicists
Mount Holyoke College alumni
Columbia University alumni
Sandia National Laboratories people
Fellow Members of the IEEE